Steyerbromelia thomasii is a plant species in the genus Steyerbromelia. This species is endemic to Venezuela.

References

thomasii
Flora of Venezuela